Metanil Yellow (Acid Yellow 36) is a dye of the azo class.  In analytical chemistry, it is used as a pH indicator and it has a color change from red to yellow between pH 1.2 and 3.2.

Although it is an unpermitted food dye, because of its bright yellow color, Metanil Yellow has been used as an adulterant in turmeric powder and arhar dal, particularly in India.

Animal studies have suggested that Metanil Yellow is neurotoxic and hepatotoxic.

References

Azo dyes
PH indicators
Organic sodium salts
Sulfonates
Acid dyes